Big Brother Australia 2007, also known as Big Brother 7, was the seventh season of the Australian reality television series Big Brother.  Episodes were broadcast on Network Ten in Australia, and the first episode aired on 22 April 2007. Despite a drop in ratings compared to previous seasons, and a number of controversies, the then Big Brother executive producer Kris Noble considers the year's season a success. At the end of this season's finale broadcast 30 July 2007, it was announced by host Gretel Killeen that Big Brother would be returning for an eighth season in 2008. In the finale Aleisha Cowcher was announced winner of Big Brother Australia 2007. She won by the closest winning margin ever in the Australian version. The news the following day reported a margin of 51% versus 49% – a difference of 65 votes. This was the last season hosted by Gretel Killeen.

Development 
During the sixth-season finale, a seventh season of the show was confirmed. Auditions were held throughout November and December 2006, taking place in Brisbane, Sydney, Melbourne, Adelaide, Perth, Hobart, and Darwin. The house this season was confirmed as to be having an 'eco-friendly' theme and style; It featured a pedal-powered washing machine, a rubber garden turf made from recycled car tyres and carpets made from goat hair. On 18 April 2007, after housemates were put into lockdown, it was revealed that there would be no prize money this season. The launch date of the seventh season was rumoured to be 22 April 2007. These rumours were later confirmed.

Changes to the format 
Big Brother 2007 introduced several new elements not seen in previous seasons of the series.

Big Brother Starburst Golden Key 
On 29 January 2007, Network Ten, Endemol Southern Star, and Masterfoods announced "Australia's biggest ever integrated television promotion", the Big Brother Starburst Golden Key, which would allow a member of the public to enter the Big Brother House as a housemate.
Unique alphanumeric codes were included in packs of Starburst, a confectionery manufactured by Masterfoods.  One hundred codes gave the opportunity to audition for the BB season after it began. Of these people, one would become a housemate and be eligible to win the season and all prizes. The winner of this competition was selected during a special episode called "Golden Key". On Day 18, Nick Sady was announced the "Golden Key" winner and entered the Big Brother House.

Prize money
Big Brother originally informed the housemates that there was zero prize money. Later they were informed that they could earn prize money by completing various tasks (similar to that of The Mole).

Friday Night Live Changes
This year the winner of Friday Night Live was given a greater power in nominations. Replacing the Three Point Twist of previous seasons, the Friday Night Live winner each week this season was required to choose one nominated housemate to be removed from the nomination line-up, and to nominate another to replace them. The winner of Friday Night Live this season was also given the chance to discuss their nominations, both past and present, with their chosen housemate whilst inside the Rewards Room.

Storeroom
All staple foods provided to housemates this year were vegan.  The housemates could supplement this with milk and eggs supplied from the farm yard and herbs and mushrooms from the herb garden.

Telephone
For the first time Big Brother Australia featured a telephone in the house. It was situated in the lounge and was shown on the Opening Night broadcast before the housemates entered the house. On Day 37, Big Brother informed housemates that if the phone rang only one housemate could answer it. Joel was nominated to answer it on the housemates' behalf. On Day 52 Joel received a call from Big Brother advising that he would be away from the house and would communicate via the phone to Joel at various times. On Day 58 Andrew picked up the phone as a joke, and was penalised by being sent to the Punishment Room to polish boots. Michelle joined him in the Punishment Room due to the weekly task which involved housemates remaining partnered.
On Day 97 the housemates were allowed to speak with several of the Big Brother UK housemates. The UK Big Brother House also had a telephone and unlike the Australian version this was the first time the phone was used in the UK version.

Chill Out Room
Adjacent to the kitchen was a new room called the "Chill Out Room". As an official rule, no more than three housemates were allowed in the room at a time. It provided a quiet place to talk or relax, away from the rest of the housemates.

White Room
On 23 April 2007, the four remaining wild-card housemates not selected to enter the House via the public vote on Days 1 and 2 were isolated in the "White Room". 
The housemates were Cruz, Demet, Kara, and Harrison. The White Room and its fixtures and fittings were all entirely white, and the housemates had only white clothes to wear. White Room housemates were provided with a white porridge which fulfilled all nutritional needs. In the centre of the room was a red button. At any time, a housemate could press the red button if they wished to leave. This decision to leave was final and the quitting housemate could not return to the Big Brother House or the White Room. The challenge was that the housemate who stayed in the White Room the longest without pressing the red button would become a legitimate Big Brother housemate and enter the main house with the rest of the housemates.
Monitors in the Big Brother House allowed the housemates to watch, without audio, the White Room housemates at all times. The White Room housemates were unaware that they were being watched by the Big Brother housemates. 
Cruz was the first white room resident evicted when he pressed the red button after Big Brother offered $750 to whoever pushed the red button first.
In the days after Cruz departed no one else volunteered to leave, so Big Brother ran a set of challenges to decide who from the White Room would move to the main house. First, Kara was evicted when Harrison and Demet nominated her. Then, the Big Brother housemates lodged their votes on who they wanted in the house. Demet won the vote and became an official housemate.

Housemates' voting
 Demet: Aleisha, Andrew, Emma, Hayley, Jamie, Joel, Kate, Rebecca
 Harrison: Bodie, Susannah, TJ, Thomas, Travis, Zoran

Secret Relationships
It was revealed on the Game On episode that housemates Hayley and Andrew were secretly in a relationship. Big Brother set the task to both housemates to enter the house and keep their relationship secret for one week. If successful in this task both would be allowed stay in the house; if they failed then one of them would be evicted. All other housemates had individually been challenged by Big Brother to secretly discover who was in a secret relationship, each believing they were the only housemate to be issued this challenge. 
Housemate Billy was added on Day 2. Billy is Hayley's former boyfriend and was added specifically to complicate her task of keeping her relationship with Andrew secret. Hayley was not allowed to inform anyone, including Andrew, of Billy's true status. Each day he received a mission from Big Brother to put pressure on Hayley's secret challenge.

Billy's Tasks
Day 2: Before Billy went to bed, he had to say "Goodnight Hayley, sweet dreams".
Day 3: From the moment Hayley woke up, Billy had to "wait on her hand and foot" and become her best friend. He also had to pick a bunch of flowers from the garden and give them to Hayley, and ask her to help pick the herbs.
Day 4: When Billy was asked to take a housemate with him to tend the animals, he had to choose Hayley.
Day 5: Billy had to become Andrew's best friend.
Big Brother confirmed on Day 8 that Billy's mission was an overall success, and his reward was becoming an official Big Brother 2007 housemate (who could compete to win Big Brother Australia 2007) on Day 16.
On 29 April episode, Big Brother revealed the secret relationship. Three housemates had correctly guessed Hayley and Billy were involved. As fewer than half of the housemates had guessed correctly, Big Brother deemed Hayley and Andrew as successful in their challenge so both were allowed to stay. Big Brother also revealed that as Hayley and Andrew had completed their task successfully $50,000 had been awarded into the prize pool.

No housemates on Rove 
Housemates this season were not featured as guests on variety/talk show Rove. Previously housemates would appear on Rove in the days following their eviction. As of 2007 Rove aired on Sunday nights at 8:30, immediately after the Big Brother eviction show. As Rove is taped in Melbourne, Victoria it was impossible for the housemates to travel so quickly to appear on both shows (it is normally a two-to-three-hour flight from the Gold Coast to Melbourne). Even so, Rove chose not to cross to evicted contestants following the eviction shows, as Rove would not start airing immediately after Big Brother.

Nominations

Viewers to nominate housemates 
The public were able to submit nomination votes via SMS for 2 July nominations. The housemate with the most votes received two nomination points, and the next housemate received one point.
With the tally counted, Michelle had the most votes from the public and so received an extra two nomination points. Daniela received an extra nomination point. As winner of Friday Night Games Daniela had the power of saving one housemate from eviction. She saved herself.

Viewers to nominate / Housemates to evict 
Big Brother changed the usual format for Week 12 nominations. For this week viewers could nominate housemates, and from the nominated housemates the housemates themselves could vote to evict, reversing the usual procedure.
While housemates were put through the usual nomination procedure and their nominations were screened, unknown to them, their nominations were ignored. Viewer nomination points were counted. On Sunday's eviction the housemates were apprised of this twist, and then were individually be asked to nominate to evict any of the nominated housemates. The nominated housemate with the most votes was to be evicted. Daniela was evicted with a total of 12 points.

Housemates
Over the 100-day season, a total of 24 housemates entered the Big Brother House, twelve during the opening night and a following twelve at various points throughout the series. On the opening night, viewers were given the opportunity to vote in two additional housemates, one male and one female, from a selection of six potential housemates, while the remaining four would be isolated in the White Room. The following night, Susannah and Zoran entered the house along with Billy, or Mr. X, whose purpose in the House was to jeopardise Andrew and Hayley's secret relationship challenge, but was not officially recognised as a legitimate housemate until Day 16. Demet, one of the four White Room Wildcards, was voted into the House by the housemates on Day 11, while Nick entered on Day 18 as the winner of the Starburst Golden Key promotion. 
A further four Intruders followed, Daniela and Laura on Day 31 and Michelle and Zach on Day 50. In a promotion for the upcoming season of Australian Idol, Kyle Sandilands entered the House as a celebrity guest with a mission from Big Brother to encourage housemates to "be themselves", but left the House early due to a severe migraine. Due to an incident prior to the Big Brother 2007 finale, Intruder Laura was not invited to attend and participate while all other former Big Brother housemates, wildcards and intruders were present.

Nominations Table 
Each housemate nominated two housemates for eviction each week, excluding the first. The first housemate listed was nominated for 2 points, whilst the second housemate was nominated for a single point. The three or more housemates with the most nomination points faced the public vote to save/evict, and when the save votes were subtracted from the evict votes, the housemate with the most evict votes was then evicted. Before the weekly nominations took place, the housemates competed in a competition called Friday Night Live (FNL) – the winner of which won a special nomination privilege – to remove one nominated housemate from the line-up and replace them with a housemate of their choice.

Nomination Notes

 : Andrew and Hayley won the privilege of immunity in this week's nominations, after managing to keep their relationship a secret from their fellow Housemates. However, they were to nominate as a couple until further notice; they could however be nominated as individuals. At this time Billy was only a guest in the House and could not nominate. Thomas was penalized with a nomination point after failing to properly nominate.
 : As a new Housemate Demet was exempt from nominating this week. Billy became an official Housemate and allowed to nominate for the first time. This week was a Double Eviction.
 : As a new Housemate Nick was exempt from nomination this week.
 : Hayley was evicted when she and Andrew were forced to choose one of them to leave the House. Daniela and Laura entered shortly after her Eviction. Emma and Aleisha were both penalized a nomination point by Big Brother for discussing nominations. In the nominations twist, prior to leaving the House, Friday Night Games winner Demet – who was evicted the night before nominations – provided a choice of Housemates whom she wished to save and whom she wished to nominate. Once her list was applied, Emma was removed from nomination, and Andrew was nominated in her place.
 : As new Housemates, Daniela and Laura were exempt from nomination this week.
 : This week, Housemates were asked to nominate the two Housemates they saw as the biggest threat to them winning Big Brother. As this week was a double eviction, the five or more Housemates with the most points faced the public vote.
 : New Housemates Michelle and Zach were exempt from nominations for the first two weeks of their stay. Thomas was awarded one nomination point for poor reasons of nominating.
 : As there was an unbalanced ratio of males to females in the House – 8 males to 3 females – this week, only males could be nominated for eviction.
 : Aleisha automatically faced the public vote this week after failing her secret mission as part of the Police Academy task.
 : Joel was exempt from nomination this week after passing a task the previous week; however he could still nominate. Big Brother gave the public 24 hours to vote for whom they want to allocate two points and one point, which would be added to the nominations total this week. The public chose Michelle (77%) and Daniela (15%).
 : This week the nomination process was reversed, with the public nominating and the Housemates evicting. In the first round of nominations, Housemates were allowed to nominate for any reason, but they were unaware that these nominations did not count. The public chose to nominate Daniela (26%), Billy (16%), Zach (14%) and Travis (13%). On Day 85 the Housemates nominated, but this time it was to evict, and Daniela was evicted with 12 out of 21 points, receiving two points from every other Housemate.
 : The final four Housemates all automatically faced the public vote – which was to be a double eviction on Day 99; the day before the finale.
 : The final two Housemates, Aleisha and Zach, both automatically faced the public vote to determine the winner; whoever received the most save votes (or the least evict votes) would be the winner.

Weekly summary and highlights 
The main events in the Big Brother 7 house are summarised in the table below. Evictions, tasks, and other events for a particular week are noted. Events in the house are listed in order of sequence.

Friday Night Live

Italic and bold denotes prize won.
 In the 13th Friday Night Games, as the winner, Travis was allowed to bring two guests into the Rewards Room.
 Andrew has won more Friday Night Games than any other housemate, in any season that "FNL" has aired in on Big Brother.
 As an extra on the final Friday Night Games, Zach (the winner) won the chance to spend a few minutes with his best friend Zac, Zack, or Zachary who Big Brother used in the last mini-task, instead of the usual prizes.

Special shows

Game On
"Game On" was a live show that was broadcast on Day 2 (23 April 2007). The results of the overnight wild-card SMS vote were revealed. Susannah and Zoran were the chosen two out of the six wild-card housemates. The remainder of the wild-card housemates were isolated in the White Room. The Daily Show was incorporated into the first part of the live show. Hosted by Gretel Killeen.

Full House
"Full House" was a live show that was broadcast on Day 8 (29 April 2007).  It was aired in the timeslot usually occupied by Eviction shows.  The relationship between Andrew and Hayley was revealed to the house, as was Billy's role to impede Hayley's task of keeping that relationship secret from the other housemates. Hayley and Andrew were deemed by Big Brother to have successfully kept their relationship a secret from the housemates for the week (fewer than half of the housemates had successfully guessed their relationship) which meant they could both stay in the house. Big Brother also revealed that for succeeding in their task they had earned $50,000 to be added to the prize money, which was previously set at zero. Big Brother also tempted the wildcard housemates to leave the White Room by offering a sum of money to them (A$750), which Cruz accepted. Hosted by Gretel Killeen.

Wild Card Entry
"Wild Card Entry" was a live show broadcast on Day 11 (2 May 2007). The White Room housemates had left the room and, dependent on their success completing various challenges, one of them would enter the Big Brother house as a housemate.  
The first round was determined by nominations from the White Room housemates; Kara was eliminated with two votes.
In the second round each housemate had to collect three major items of clothing and dress a model while airborne on a large steel frame.
The third round was determined by nominations from the Big Brother housemates. To cast their vote they placed a plastic ball into the corresponding tube for either Harrison or Demet. Demet won with 8 votes against 6.
Hosted by Gretel Killeen.

Golden Key
"Golden Key" was a live show broadcast on Day 18 (9 May 2007). This special was to select the winner of the Starburst Golden Key. The show's producers had selected five finalists from the original 100 Golden Key winners after an intensive audition process. The chosen finalists were Carolyn, Nick, Natalie, Angie and Laura. To select which would become a housemate contestants chose one of five numbered discs randomly from a bag. Then they were allocated a clear box of confectionery depending on which disc they had selected. One box also contained a golden key, and the contestant whose box contained the key, Nick, was designated the new housemate. He entered the house during the show, while the housemates were conducting their weekly task performance. Hosted by Gretel Killeen.

Intruder Alert! / Intruder Eviction
"Intruder Alert!" was a live 90-minute special that aired on Day 31 (22 May 2007). Hayley was evicted from the house during the episode. Later new housemates Daniela and Laura entered as intruders. Hosted by Gretel Killeen.

The Works
"The Works" was a scheduled Big Brother special focusing on behind the scenes footage that was planned to air on Day 46 (6 June 2007). The show would have been recorded on the same day at Network Ten's Pyrmont studios. The show was later cancelled for unapparent reasons.

Live Eviction 6 / Intruders Incoming
The 6th Live Eviction show was a 90-minute eviction and intruder special that aired on Day 50 (10 June 2007). It featured a double eviction and introduced the two new intruders, Michelle and Zach. Michelle entered and met the remaining housemates. Zach remained in the Rewards Room, awaiting entry during UpLate later that evening. Hosted by Gretel Killeen and Mike Goldman.

Kyle in the House
"Kyle in the House" was a special version of the daily show that aired for 60 minutes before Live Eviction 11 on Day 85 (15 July 2007). It featured a recap on Kyle Sandilands' entry to the house and during the show Big Brother set Sandilands a special task to "challenge the housemates".

Live Eviction 11
The 11th Live Eviction show aired immediately after the special daily show on Day 85 (15 July 2007). The remaining housemates were forced to vote out one of the nominated housemates, and Daniela was evicted with a total of 12 points, meaning that every housemate except herself had given her two points. Hosted by Gretel Killeen.

Gretel Goes In
The final nomination show on Day 93 (23 July 2007) was a special where the housemates did not need to nominate and instead Killeen went into the Rewards Room to interview the housemates individually and ask questions supplied by the viewers. Hosted by Gretel Killeen.

Quest For Glory
The final Friday Night Live show on Day 97 (27 July 2007).

Final Sunday Double Eviction
Final Sunday Double Eviction was the last Eviction of Big Brother 2007, and was broadcast live in front of an audience on Day 99 (29 July 2007) from Dreamworld, and was hosted by Gretel Killeen.

Finale
The season finale aired on Day 100 (30 July 2007) in which Aleisha was announced the winner and Zach the runner-up. It was the closest winning margin in Australian Big Brother history of less than 500 votes and the announcement of the winner was delayed by an hour after the voting lines closed as votes were rechecked. At one point during the final episode, there was just 64 votes difference between the last two housemates. Aleisha is the second female to win Big Brother Australia.

Reception 
The 2007 launch had the smallest ever opening episode audience in all seven Australian Big Brother series, and a 14% drop from the previous year's opening night. Network Ten came second overall but lost the night to Nine Network's 60 Minutes. Nevertheless, with an average of 1.549 million viewers, the opening night was Ten's best Sunday night of the year, to date. The series finale was expected to have just under two million viewers, a 10% drop from 2006's finale. Network Ten later announced that the peak audience for the finale was 2.3 million viewers. Crikey's media reporter Glenn Dyer stated that Ten's reported figures were exaggerated, and that the average number of viewers was 1.791 million for the entire show, not 1.9 as Ten had stated, which only accounted for 8.30pm – 10pm. He also said that while the peak of 2.3 million viewers beat the 2006 finale, the average audience was fewer than the 2006 finale's average 1.88 million viewers.
In June, the series ratings were down 5% overall and 13% in the 16- to 39-year-old demographic compared to the previous year's series.

By the series' final week in July these figures had dropped a further 5% and 2% respectively. The Daily Show and Live Eviction Show were down 100,000 and 200,000 viewers respectively. Overall the season attracted around one million viewers each night.
The show received several bad reviews. The Sunday Telegraph stated that "nothing could get worse for the ratings-challenged BB". The Daily Telegraph named the series "Most. Boring. Ever." The Sunday Herald Sun said that the show "has committed the worst television sin – it is boring." eBroadcast Australia considered the program "left lifeless and fading" after the finale. Christian Today thought the entire season "a slump in rating". One review in The Age praised the series, pointing out the highlights of the season and claiming "[Big Brother] is as enjoyable as watching a quality sitcom or drama". Another Age journalist disagreed, commenting that the 2007 series "just didn't sparkle".
In comments reported in a newspaper article, evicted housemate Emma reflected on the program's reduced ratings and noted that whilst inside the house the housemates joked about whether the show had been cancelled.

Ratings

Ratings are rounded to the nearest ten thousand. Uplate shows are not included in official averages. Figures in bold include consolidated viewing figures.

Controversy 
 The Daily Telegraph had reported on 21 April 2007 – the day before the show's launch – that an internet hacker claimed to have obtained the names of the 18 housemates from the official Three Mobile website: "Aleisha, Andrew, Brodie, Cruz, Demet, Emma, Harrison, Hayley, Jamie, Joel, Kara, Kate, Rebecca, Sussannah, Thomas, TJ, Travis, and Zoran". A Three Mobile spokeswoman denied the claims and told the media that the names were not "hacked" or "leaked" from the Three Mobile site, refusing to confirm whether the housemates names' and photos were real.
 Because of the pre-recorded nature of launch shows, members of different forums and websites decided to have live streams using mobile phones allowing people to listen to the show before it was broadcast on national television. Because of this, recording of the show stopped until the streaming was stopped.  Eventually, production staff offered prizes if audience members would pick out people from the crowd using phones to broadcast the show.
 The Daily Telegraph had reported that Big Brother producers had failed to censor offensive language when housemate Bodie told other housemates he was "dense cunt" during the PG-rated Daily Show on Tuesday 24 April 2007.
 The Sunday Mail on 29 April 2007 had reported that the parents of Mormon housemate Rebecca, were upset that their daughter was under siege from fellow housemates over her decision not to join in their party antics.
 The Daily Telegraph had reported on 4 May 2007 that housemate Kate's situation regarding her pregnancy and pre-eclampsia was known by Network Ten and producer Endemol Southern Star before her entry to the house. This subsequently led to her breakdown regarding the "Newborn Group Task".
 The Courier-Mail, The Daily Telegraph and The Age had reported that backpackers, students and other young people were being paid as little as $50 a day cash-in-hand for stunt work for the Friday Night Live Games episodes of Big Brother. It is claimed that they were used to test the various stunts that the housemates would have to perform. The Office of Workplace Services and other government departments were investigating the claims to see if the producers Endemol Southern Star were in breach of any laws or regulations.
 Week 8 of Friday Night Live had a "Mexican" theme where housemates had to throw liquid-filled balloons at a Mexican Flag, with the intention of drenching the fabric. This use of the Mexican flag provoked criticism from Mexican officials. In a letter to the Australian Communications and Media Authority and production company Endemol Southern Star, Mexico's Foreign Ministry complained about the offensive use of the country's flag. "(We) demand they take adequate measures to avoid this type of incident in the future", the ministry said. The show's producers later issued an apology.
 The Daily Telegraph reported on 3 July that host Gretel Killeen is being accused of being aggressive towards some housemates, in particular Jamie during his eviction interview after he suggested the video package shown of him crying and sitting alone was biased towards the negative. Later she was criticised for being particularly aggressive towards Rebecca, Thomas and Jamie. Killeen was also criticised for hypocrisy having aggressively questioned why Jamie did not intervene when Michelle argued with Aleisha, and yet she was receptive towards Michelle herself on her eviction, and even rationalised Michelle's behaviour during the argument. Michelle was also named the most unpopular housemate ever to inhabit the Australian Big Brother House.
 Former housemate Susannah had left her partner and started dating fellow housemate Thomas after leaving the BB house. It was reported that her ex, Anthony Murphy, had blamed the reality TV show for the demise of their relationship.

References

External links 
 Big Brother Australia
 Big Brother 2007 – Daily Telegraph Feature

07
2007 Australian television seasons